The Kuala Lumpur Hockey Club or KLHC (formerly known as Arthur Andersen Hockey Club & Ernst & Young HC, after the previous owner and main sponsor), are the Malaysia Hockey League club from the city Kuala Lumpur, Malaysia. The team is led by  Azlan Misron, a member of Malaysia national field hockey team.

Kuala Lumpur Hockey Club is currently the most successful team in Malaysia Hockey League; they won league thrice in season 2006-2007, 2007–2008 and 2008-2009 (as Ernst & Young HC) and also thrice in year 2009-2010, 2010-2011 & 2011-2012 (as Kuala Lumpur Hockey Club). KLHC is the biggest club in the Malaysia Hockey League history in Malaysia country . This club also has represented Malaysia in the Asian hockey club competition, and many players from this club played at the World Cup and Olympic Games.

History

 2000–2001: Arthur Andersen Hockey Club
 2001–2008: Ernst & Young Hockey Club
 2009–present: Kuala Lumpur Hockey Club

Players

Current squad
The squad which took part in the 2017 Malaysia Hockey League.

Former players
  Ali Raza - 2005
  Muhammad Sarwar - 2005
  Khairulnizam Ibrahim - 2011
  Megat Azrafiq Megat Termizi - 2011
  Mohd Sufian Mohamad - 2011
  Muhammad Noor Faeez Ibrahim - 2011

Club officials

Honours

Malaysia Hockey League
  League
 Winners (9): 2005-06, 2006-07, 2007-08, 2008-09, 2009-10, 2010-11, 2011-12, 2013, 2017

Hockey Asian Champion Clubs Cup
  Cup
 Winners (1): 2007-08
 Runners Up (1): 2009-10

References

Malaysian field hockey clubs
Field hockey clubs established in 2000
2000 establishments in Malaysia